"Feels like Home" is a song by English DJ and record producer Sigala, English-Ghanaian recording artist Fuse ODG and Jamaican rapper Sean Paul, featuring guest vocals from American recording artist Kent Jones. It was written by Sigala, Jones, Fuse ODG, Paul and Janée Bennett, with the song's production handled by Sigala. It was released to digital retailers on 14 June 2018, through Ministry of Sound Recordings and B1 Recordings.

Background
"Feels like Home" was first announced by Sigala on 13 June 2018, a day before its release. Sigala announced that it was the first single from the "#SummerOfSigala" campaign, previously launched by his album preview party of the same name in Ibiza.

Track listing

Credits and personnel
Credits adapted from Tidal.

Sean Paul – composition, lyrics, vocals, programming
Fuse ODG – composition, lyrics, vocals
Kent Jones – composition, lyrics, vocals
Janée Bennett – composition, lyrics
Kevin Grainger – mix engineering, master engineering
Neil Walters – trumpet
Dipesh Parmar – editing, programming
Joakim Jarl – programming
Hal Ritson – programming
Steve Manovski – programming

Charts

References

2018 songs
2018 singles
Sigala songs
Fuse ODG songs
Sean Paul songs
Songs written by Sigala
Songs written by Sean Paul
Songs written by Jin Jin (musician)
Songs written by Kent Jones (rapper)